William Alexander Hay, Baron Hay of Ballyore (called Willie; born 16 April 1950, in Milford, County Donegal, Republic of Ireland) is a Democratic Unionist Party (DUP) politician, who was a Member of the Northern Ireland Assembly (MLA) for Foyle from 1998 to 2014.

He has been a Member of the House of Lords since 2014.
He was the Speaker of the Northern Ireland Assembly from 8 May 2007 to 13 October 2014. He attended Faughan Valley High School, Drumahoe, County Londonderry. An Irish citizen by birth, he has objected to not being deemed automatically eligible for British nationality.

Political career
Hay was elected to Londonderry City Council in Northern Ireland in 1981 for the Democratic Unionist Party. He served as Mayor in 1993 and Deputy Mayor in 1992. In 1996 he was an unsuccessful candidate in the Northern Ireland Forum election in Foyle., but was elected to the Northern Ireland Assembly in 1998. He is a member of the Northern Ireland Housing Council and the Londonderry Port and Harbour Commission. and in 2001 became a member of the Northern Ireland Policing Board.

Hay was elected Speaker of the Northern Ireland Assembly on 8 May 2007 following the restoration of devolution. He also is a prominent member of the Orange Order and Apprentice Boys of Derry.

On 6 October 2014, Hay announced his retirement from the Northern Ireland Assembly as both MLA and Speaker. The role of the Speaker had been taken on by Mitchel McLaughlin in a temporary capacity in September 2014 because of Hay's ill health. However, in a letter read to the Assembly, he announced his retirement from the Assembly effective from 13 October 2014 in order to concentrate on returning to good health.

In August 2014, it was announced that he would get a life peerage to sit in the House of Lords and he opted to sit there as a crossbencher, despite being nominated by DUP. Hay was ennobled on 16 December 2014 and took the title Baron Hay of Ballyore, of Ballyore in the City of Londonderry. He subsequently sat as a DUP member.

Nationality

He is an Irish citizen with an Irish passport because he refuses to pay a £1,300 UK naturalisation fee (and take the "Life in the UK" test) required for people, such as him, who wish to become a British citizen. "I see myself as a British citizen living in Northern Ireland all my life. I have a right to British citizenship and a British passport. I am being discriminated against because I can't get my British passport," he told the Northern Ireland Affairs Committee at Westminster in April 2021.

See also
 British nationality law
British nationality law and the Republic of Ireland
 Irish nationality law

References

External links
 Londonderry Democratic Unionist Party
 NI Assembly – Speaker of the Northern Ireland Assembly
 DUP party website profile

|-

|-

|-

1950 births
Living people
Democratic Unionist Party MLAs
Northern Ireland MLAs 1998–2003
Northern Ireland MLAs 2003–2007
Northern Ireland MLAs 2007–2011
Northern Ireland MLAs 2011–2016
Crossbench life peers
Democratic Unionist Party life peers
Irish Protestants
People from County Londonderry
Politicians from County Donegal
Politicians from County Londonderry
Speakers of the Northern Ireland Assembly
Mayors of Derry
Life peers created by Elizabeth II